The Armenian Evangelical Church was established on July 1, 1846, by thirty-seven men and three women in Constantinople.

History
In the 19th century there was an intellectual and spiritual awakening in Constantinople. This awakening and enlightenment pushed the reformists to study the Bible. Under the patronage of the Armenian Patriarchate, a secondary school was opened, headed by Krikor Peshtimaljian (died 1837), one of the leading intellectuals of the time. The principal aim of this school was to train qualified clergy for the Armenian Apostolic Church.

The result of this awakening was the formation of a society called the "Pietistical Union". The members held meetings for the study of the Bible. During these meetings and Bible studies, questions were raised regarding the practices and traditions of the church, which to them seemed to conflict with biblical truths.

These reformists faced strong retaliation from the Armenian Patriarchate of Constantinople. Eventually, after Patriarch Matteos Chouhajian excommunicated the reformists, they were forced to organize themselves into a separate religious community, the Protestant Millet. This separation led to the formation of the Armenian Evangelical Church in 1846.

Today, there are approximately 100 Armenian Evangelical churches in the following countries: Argentina, Armenia, Australia, Belgium, Brazil, Bulgaria, Canada, Cyprus, Egypt, England, France, Georgia, Greece, Iran, Iraq, Lebanon, Syria, Turkey, Uruguay, and the United States of America.

Armenian Evangelical Unions 
 Union of the Armenian Evangelical Churches in the Near East (UAECNE, 1924)
 Armenian Evangelical Union of North America (AEUNA, 1971)
 Armenian Evangelical Union of France (AEUF, 1924)
 Union of Evangelical Churches in Armenia (1995)
 Armenian Evangelical Union of Eurasia (1995)
 Armenian Evangelical Fellowship of Europe
 Union of Armenian Evangelical Unions in Bulgaria (1995)

Armenian Brethren
Groups of Brethren assemblies exist in Armenia, Lebanon, Syria, the United States, and Australia.

References

Rev. Hagop A. Chakmakjian, The Armenian Evangelical Church and The Armenian People

External links
Armenian Evangelical Union of North America (AEUNA)
Armenian Missionary Association of America (AMAA)
Union of Armenian Evangelical Churches in the Near East (UAECNE)
Union des Eglises Evangéliques Arméniennes de France
Evangelical Church of Armenia
Armenian Protestants

 
Religious organizations established in 1846
Christian denominations in Asia
Evangelical denominations established in the 19th century
1846 establishments in the Ottoman Empire
Evangelical denominations in Asia